Radio Taiwan International (RTI) is the English name and call sign of the Central Broadcasting System (CBS), national broadcaster and international radio service of the Republic of China, commonly known as Taiwan. It is a government-owned station that broadcasts in 14 languages around the world via the internet, shortwave and podcasts. It also has Facebook fan pages in five additional languages. The station’s hosts and programs have won many national and global broadcasting awards.

History 

The Central Broadcasting System was founded in 1928 as the voice of the Kuomintang (KMT) government quartered in Nanking on mainland China. During the Second Sino-Japanese War the KMT was forced by Japanese advances to relocate the radio station, along with the capital city, first to Hankou in the central Hubei Province and then to Chungking in south-central China.

After the conclusion of the Second World War, which saw the surrender and withdrawal of Japanese forces, the KMT and the Chinese Communist Party resumed their civil war. The defeated KMT retreated to Taiwan in 1949 and the Central Broadcasting System moved with them.

Current status 
RTI currently offers audio news and programs about Taiwan in 14 languages. It also has YouTube channels offering video news and programs and can be seen on Twitter and Facebook as well.

After undergoing restructuring during the period 1996–98, CBS broadcast to mainland China and the rest of the world under the call sign Radio Taipei International and the Voice of Asia.  Radio Taipei International essentially replaced the international radio services of the Broadcasting Corporation of China (BCC), known as the Voice of Free China. Radio Taipei International broadcast to China and to an international audience; by contrast, the Voice of Asia was broadcast to the Asia-Pacific region only and offered a lighter format than RTI. In 2002 the Voice of Asia call sign was dropped to leave Radio Taipei International as the sole broadcasting name for the service. This was in turn changed to Radio Taiwan International, to avoid confusion on the part of listeners, who had trouble associating Taipei with Taiwan.

In addition, via domestic AM radio and shortwave, CBS also broadcast three different "networks" in Chinese (mainly Mandarin and Taiwanese) to the mainland.  These networks were the News Network (a news and information-oriented service), the Variety Network (a music and features-oriented service, also known as the Mandarin Programme, Taiwanese Programme, Perspective Program, or the Pop Network Programme), and the Dialect Network (programming aimed at the minorities of China). In time, the Variety Network was renamed the General Network, the News Network became the Mainland Network, and eventually the Mainland, General, and Dialect Network were merged in with Radio Taiwan International. One consequence of this was that CBS could no longer broadcast domestically over AM radio.

Broadcasting details 
Radio Taiwan International broadcasts to the following countries and regions:

 Australia and New Zealand
 China
 Europe
 Indonesia
 Japan
 Korea
 The Philippines
 South Africa
 South Asia
 Southeast Asia
 United States

Programming is carried in Mandarin, Taiwanese Hokkien, English, Hokkien, Cantonese, Hakka, Japanese, Indonesian, Thai, Vietnamese, Spanish, German, French and Russian (previously also in Arabic, Burmese, Mongolian and Tibetan).

As of 1 July 2013, RTI terminated its shortwave broadcasts to North and South America due to budget cuts caused by the closure of WYFR, a Christian religious shortwave station which RTI leased airtime from and whose Florida transmitter RTI used to broadcast to the Americas. RTI programming was broadcast on WYFR at 5.95 MHz and 9.61 MHz between 17:00 / 18:00 hrs. Eastern until 03:00 / 04:00. After that point, Family Radio continued to host RTI's audio service to the Chinese community in the New York City area on a digital subchannel of Family Radio's television station, WFME-TV; this would end in October 2013, when the station was revamped into an international ethnic station, WNYJ-TV.

Radio Taiwan broadcasts daily in Mandarin, Taiwanese (Minnan or Hokkien), Hakka, Cantonese, English, German, French, Russian, Spanish, Japanese, Vietnamese, Thai, Indonesian and Korean. It also has Facebook pages in English.

Programs
Taiwan Insider, its flagship weekly video and audio news magazine program
Taiwan Today, an award-winning audio program on politics and society
Feast Meets West, an award-winning program about food and culture

See also 
Media in Taiwan
 English language print media published by the Government Information Office
Taiwan Review
Taiwan Journal
Voice of Free China

References

External links
 
 

International broadcasters
Chinese-language radio stations
Radio stations in Taiwan
Radio stations established in 1928
Public broadcasting in Taiwan